South Queensferry railway station served the town of South Queensferry, Edinburgh, Scotland from 1868 to 1929 on the South Queensferry Branch.

History

First station 
The station opened on 1 June 1868 by the North British Railway. To the north was the goods yard. The first station closed and was relocated when the line was extended to Port Edgar on 2 September 1878. It became a goods yard.

Second station 
This station replaced the former terminus on 2 September 1878. It closed on 5 March 1890 but reopened on 1 December 1919 but as South Queensferry Halt. To the east was a siding. It closed permanently on 14 January 1929.

References

External links 

Disused railway stations in Edinburgh
Former North British Railway stations
Railway stations in Great Britain opened in 1868
Railway stations in Great Britain closed in 1878 
Railway stations in Great Britain opened in 1878
Railway stations in Great Britain closed in 1890
Railway stations in Great Britain opened in 1919
Railway stations in Great Britain closed in 1929
1868 establishments in Scotland
1929 disestablishments in Scotland